Greg Lomack Allen (born March 15, 1993) is an American professional baseball outfielder in the Boston Red Sox organization. He made his Major League Baseball (MLB) debut with the Cleveland Indians in 2017 and has also played for the San Diego Padres, New York Yankees, and Pittsburgh Pirates.

Amateur career
Allen attended Hilltop High School in Chula Vista, California. He then attended San Diego State University, where he played college baseball for three seasons for the San Diego State Aztecs. In 2013, he played collegiate summer baseball with the Orleans Firebirds of the Cape Cod Baseball League.

Professional career

Cleveland Indians
The Cleveland Indians selected Allen in the sixth round of the 2014 MLB draft. After signing with Cleveland, Allen was assigned to the Mahoning Valley Scrappers and spent the whole season there, batting .244 with 19 runs batted in (RBIs) and 30 stolen bases in 57 games played. In 2015, he played for the Lake County Captains where he slashed .273/.368/.382 with seven home runs, 45 RBIs, and 43 stolen bases in 123 games. He also played in three games for the Lynchburg Hillcats at the end of the season. In 2016, Allen played for Lynchburg before he was promoted to the Akron RubberDucks. In 129 total games between the two teams, he batted .295 with seven home runs, 44 RBIs, 45 stolen bases, and an .830 OPS. After the season, the Indians assigned Allen to the Mesa Solar Sox of the Arizona Fall League. He was reported to be involved in a trade to the Milwaukee Brewers for Jonathan Lucroy; however, the trade fell apart after Lucroy refused to waive his no-trade clause.

Allen began the 2017 season with Akron. The Indians promoted him to the major leagues on September 1, 2017. In 71 games for Akron prior to his promotion he was batting .264 with two home runs, 24 RBIs, and 21 stolen bases. On September 7, Allen hit his first MLB home run.

Allen began 2018 with the Columbus Clippers. On May 27, 2018, Allen hit his first career walk-off home run against the Astros in the 14th inning. On September 23, 2018, Allen hit a base hit in the bottom of the 11th inning against the Boston Red Sox for the Indians to walk off. Allen ended the season with a .257 batting average and 21 stolen bases.

San Diego Padres
On August 31, 2020, the Indians traded Allen, along with Mike Clevinger and Matt Waldron, to the San Diego Padres in exchange for Austin Hedges, Josh Naylor, Cal Quantrill, and minor league players Gabriel Arias, Owen Miller, and Joey Cantillo. He played in one game for San Diego before they optioned him to their alternate training site. On December 31, 2020, Allen was designated for assignment by the Padres following the signing of Ha-seong Kim.

New York Yankees
On January 6, 2021, the Padres traded Allen to the New York Yankees in exchange for James Reeves. On February 23, 2021, Allen was designated for assignment by the Yankees after the Justin Wilson signing was made official. On March 1, Allen was outrighted and invited to spring training as a non-roster invitee. He was assigned to the Triple-A Scranton/Wilkes-Barre RailRiders to begin the season. When the Yankees had an outbreak of COVID-19, the Yankees selected Allen to the major leagues on July 16. Allen played in 15 games for the Yankees, hitting .270 with no home runs and two RBIs. On August 5, Allen was returned to Triple-A Scranton and removed from the 40-man roster. The Yankees added Allen to their roster for the 2021 American League Wild Card Game.

Pittsburgh Pirates
On November 5, 2021, Allen was claimed off waivers by the Pittsburgh Pirates.

In an April 3, 2022 game against the Tampa Bay Rays during Spring Training, Allen tweaked his hamstring. He was placed on the 60-day injured list four days later with a left hamstring strain. He was activated from the injured list on July 22.

On September 26, 2022, Allen was designated for assignment.

Boston Red Sox
On January 11, 2023, Allen signed a minor league contract with the Boston Red Sox.

References

External links

1993 births
Living people
African-American baseball players
Baseball players from San Diego
Major League Baseball outfielders
Cleveland Indians players
San Diego Padres players
New York Yankees players
Pittsburgh Pirates players
San Diego State Aztecs baseball players
Orleans Firebirds players
Arizona League Indians players
Mahoning Valley Scrappers players
Lake County Captains players
Lynchburg Hillcats players
Akron RubberDucks players
Columbus Clippers players
Mesa Solar Sox players
Scranton/Wilkes-Barre RailRiders players
21st-century African-American sportspeople
Bradenton Marauders players